The following is a list of notable deaths in February 1995.

Entries for each day are listed alphabetically by surname. A typical entry lists information in the following sequence:
 Name, age, country of citizenship at birth, subsequent country of citizenship (if applicable), reason for notability, cause of death (if known), and reference.

February 1995

1
Róbert Antal, 73, Hungarian water polo player and Olympic gold medalist.
Joe Bacuzzi, 78, English footballer and coach.
Lajos Balthazár, 73, Hungarian fencer and Olympic silver medalist.
François Boutin, 58, French thoroughbred horse trainer, heart attack.
Gerard Carlier, 77, Dutch athlete who participated in the 1936 Summer Olympics.
Richey Edwards, 27, Welsh musician.
Yngve Gamlin, 68, Swedish actor and film director.
Karl Gruber, 85, Austrian politician and diplomat.
Leon Leonard, 85, American politician.
Jill Phipps, 31, English animal rights activist, crushed by a lorry during a protest.
Walter Wischniewsky, 82, German film editor.

2
Tikvah Alper, 86, South African scientist whose work helped develop prion theory.
Raymond Bark-Jones, 83, English rugby union lock.
Doug Berndt, 45, American figure skater and Olympic bronze medalist.
Phillip Borsos, 41, Australian-born Canadian film director, producer, and screenwriter, leukemia.
Chandulal Chandrakar, 75, Indian journalist and politician.
John Clogston, 41, American journalist and academic.
André Frossard, 80, French journalist and essayist.
Thomas Hayward, 77, American operatic tenor, kidney failure.
David Kindersley, 79, British stone letter-carver and typeface designer.
Fred Perry, 85, English tennis champion.
Donald Pleasence, 75, English actor (Halloween, You Only Live Twice, The Great Escape), BAFTA winner (1959), heart failure.
Herman Tuvesson, 92, Swedish wrestler.
Willard Waterman, 80, American actor (The Great Gildersleeve, The Apartment, Dennis the Menace), bone cancer.

3
Ragnar Berge, 70, Norwegian footballer who played for Vålerenga Fotball.
Pavol Hrivnák, 63, Slovak politician.
Art Kane, 69, American photographer, suicide.
Nicolás Lindley López, 86, Peruvian military commander.
Andrei Nikolsky, 36, Russian pianist, traffic collision.
Ingeborg Nilsson, 70, Norwegian figure skater.
John Pinsent, 72, English classical scholar who specialized in Greek mythology.
Abbas Zaryab, 75, Iranian historian, writer, literature professor and Iranologist.

4
David Alexander, 56, Welsh singer and entertainer, heart attack.
Hamza Boubakeur, 82, French politician and Muslim cleric.
Godfrey Brown, 79, British track and field athlete and Olympic champion.
Abel Santa Cruz, 80, Argentine screenwriter, cancer.
Aloísio de Oliveira, 80, Brazilian record producer, singer, actor and composer.
Manohar Hardikar, 58, Indian Test cricket player.
Patricia Highsmith, 74, American author (The Talented Mr. Ripley, Strangers on a Train, The Price of Salt), lung cancer and aplastic anemia.
Scott Smith, 46, American gay rights activist, AIDS-related pneumonia.
Roel Wiersma, 62, Dutch footballer.
Walter Zeller, 67, German Grand Prix motorcycle road racer.

5
Jimmy Allen, 85, English footballer and football manager.
Frank Costin, 74, British automotive engineer.
Des Foley, 54, Irish Gaelic football player and hurler.
Doug McClure, 59, American actor (The Virginian, Out of This World, Gidget), lung cancer.
Frederick Riddle, 82, British violist.
Bhanubandhu Yugala, 84, Thai film director, playwright, composer and author.

6
Flora Anne Armitage, 83, American biographer and novelist.
Richard H. Bassett, 94, American impressionist painter.
Elmer Burkart, 78, American baseball player (Philadelphia Phillies).
Edy Campagnoli, 60, Italian television personality and actress.
Chester E. Holifield, 91, American businessman and politician.
Hans Hummel, 50, Austrian Grand Prix motorcycle road racer.
Jeanette Kawas, 49, Honduran environmental activist, homicide.
Mira Lobe, 81, Austrian children's writer.
Maruja Mallo, 93, Spanish surrealist painter.
James Merrill, 68, American poet, AIDS-related complications.
Gustav Rödel, 79, German fighter pilot and fighter ace.
Art Taylor, 65, American jazz drummer.
Xia Yan, 94, Chinese playwright, screenwriter, and  politician.

7
Roy S. Benson, 88, American naval officer.
Jean Giraudeau, 78, French tenor and artist.
Odd Grythe, 76, Norwegian radio and television personality.
Billy Jones, 45, American guitarist, singer, and founding member of the Outlaws, suicide by gunshot.
Massimo Pallottino, 85, Italian archaeologist specializing in Etruscan civilization and art.
Cecil Upshaw, 52, American baseball player, heart attack.
Helen Wallis, 70, British Map Curator at the British Museum, cancer.

8
Józef Maria Bocheński, 92, Polish Dominican, logician and philosopher.
Kalpana Datta, 81, Indian independence movement activist.
May Miller, 96, American poet, playwright and educator.
Tika Ram Paliwal, 85, Indian politician.
Osvaldo Panzutto, 65, Argentine football player.
Gloria Shea, 84, American film actress.
Bhaskar Sadashiv Soman, 81, Indian Navy admiral.
Willi Soukop, 88, English sculptor.
Rachel Thomas, 89, Welsh actress, fall.
Ole Torvalds, 78, Finnish-Swedish journalist and poet.
Buck Warnick, 79, American composer, arranger, lyricist, conductor, and musical director.

9
J. William Fulbright, 89, American senator and congressman, stroke.
Maurice Halperin, 88, American writer, professor, diplomat, and accused Soviet spy.
Kalevi Keihänen, 70, Finnish entrepreneur.
Eugen Loderer, 74, German trade union leader.
Ignazio Spalla, 70, Italian film actor.
David Wayne, 81, American actor (Finian's Rainbow, House Calls, The Andromeda Strain), Tony winner (1947, 1954), lung cancer.

10
Leila Arjumand Banu, 66, Bangladeshi singer and social activist.
Dinesh Chandra Chattopadhyay, 78, Bengali writer and editor.
Straight Clark, 70, American tennis player.
Jesús Garay, 64, Spanish football player.
Paul Monette, 49, American author, poet, and activist, AIDS-related complications.
Leonard Silk, 77, American economist, author, and journalist.

11
Lillian K. Bradley, 73, American mathematician and mathematics educator.
L. C. Graves, 76, American police detective.
Otto Kratky, 92, Austrian physicist.
Harry Merkel, 77, German racing driver.
Bob Randall, 57, American screenwriter, playwright, novelist, and television producer.

12
Nat Holman, 98, American basketball player and college coach.
Philip Taylor Kramer, 42, American bass guitar player, traffic collision.
Earring George Mayweather, 67, American electric blues and Chicago blues harmonica player, songwriter and singer, liver cancer.
Rachid Mimouni, 49, Algerian writer, teacher and human rights activist, hepatitis.
Tony Secunda, 54, English manager of rock groups (The Moody Blues, Procol Harum, The Move and Motörhead), heart attack.
Astrid Villaume, 71, Danish actress of stage and film.

13
Sylvester Ahola, 92, American jazz trumpeter and cornetist.
James P. Berkeley, 87, United States Marine Corps lieutenant general.
Bill Beveridge, 85, Canadian ice hockey goaltender in the NHL.
Alberto Burri, 79, Italian artist.
Wilton Gaynair, 68, Jamaican jazz saxophonist.
Ray Hamilton, 79, American gridiron football player.
Guglielmo Mancori, 67, Italian cinematographer, lighting director and camera operator.
Jack O'Billovich, 52, Canadian football player.
Shimon Schwab, 86, German-American Orthodox rabbi..
Bruno Visentini, 80, Italian politician, senator, minister, and industrialist.
Li Zhisui, 75, Chinese physician and confidante of Mao Zedong.

14
Ogdo Aksyonova, 59, Dolgan poet, the founder of Dolgan written literature.
Maria Andergast, 82, German actress.
Jack Cleary, 83, Australian rules footballer.\t\t
Constance Teander Cohen, 74, American painter.
Roger de Grey, 76, British landscape painter.
Nigel Finch, 45, English film director and filmmaker, AIDS-related illness.
Michael V. Gazzo, 71, American playwright and actor (The Godfather Part II, 1st & Ten, Last Action Hero), stroke.
Len Goulden, 82, English football player.
Ischa Meijer, 52, Dutch journalist, television presenter, radio presenter, critic and author, heart attack.
U Nu, 87, Burmese politician, 1st Prime Minister of Burma.
Achille Piccini, 83, Italian football player.

15
Rachid Baba Ahmed, 48, Algerian record producer, composer, and singer, murdered.
Sergio Bertoni, 79, Italian footballer.
Seymour Berry, 2nd Viscount Camrose, 85, British nobleman, politician, and newspaper proprietor.
Italo Alighiero Chiusano, 68, Italian writer and critic.
Francis Taylor, Baron Taylor of Hadfield, 90, English businessman who founded Taylor Woodrow.
John J. Louis Jr., 69, American businessman and diplomat.
David Monas Maloney, 82, American Roman Catholic bishop.

16
Svend Albinus, 93, Danish architect.
Anna Margaret Ross Alexander, 81, American philanthropist.
Nicolae Costin, 58, Moldovan politician and one of the leaders of the national emancipation movement.
Mildred Esther Mathias, 88, American botanist and professor.
Rachel Tzabari, 85, Israeli politician.
Margaret Wade, 82, American basketball player and coach.
Lois Wilde, 87, American actress, model, dancer, and beauty contest winner.

17
Charles Balloun, 90, American politician from Iowa.
Werner Bruschke, 96, East German politician and member of the Socialist Unity Party of Germany.
Paddy Collins, 91, Irish hurler.
Thelma Hulbert, 81, English visual artist known for her still lives and landscapes.
Mirosław Żuławski, 82, Polish writer, prosaist, diplomat and screenwriter.

18
Zair Azgur, 87, Soviet and Belarusian sculptor.
Walter Ball, 83, Canadian cartoonist.
Denny Cordell, 51, English record producer, lymphoma.
Eddie Gilbert, 33, American professional wrestler and booker, heart attack.
Bill Graham, 75, Australian politician.
Yank Lawson, 83, American jazz trumpeter.
Kenneth Setton, 80, American historian and an expert on the history of medieval Europe.
Bob Stinson, 35, American rock guitarist who founded The Replacements, organ failure.

19
Soup Cable, 81, American professional basketball player.
Yan Chernyak, 85, World War II spy for the Soviet Union.Louis-Pierre Cécile, 90, Canadian politician.
Nicholas Fairbairn, 61, Scottish politician, liver cirrhosis.
Nigel Findley, 35, Canadian game designer, editor, and science fiction author, heart attack.
John Howard, 81, American actor (The Philadelphia Story, Lost Horizon, Bulldog Drummond Comes Back).
Gaul Machlis, 76, Israeli football player and manager.
Noel Rockmore, 86, American painter, draughtsman, and sculptor.
Richard Matthews, 73, New Zealand plant virologist.
Calder Willingham, 72, American novelist and screenwriter (Paths of Glory, One-Eyed Jacks, The Graduate), cancer.

20
Rabbi Shlomo Zalman Auerbach, 84, Orthodox Jewish rabbi.
Robert Bolt, 70, English playwright and screenwriter (Lawrence of Arabia, Doctor Zhivago, A Man for All Seasons), Oscar winner (1966, 1967), stroke.
Arthur Burge, 77, Australian water polo player who competed in the 1948 Summer Olympics.
Néstor Mora, 31, Colombian racing cyclist, bicycle accident.

21
Paul L. Bates, 86, United States Army officer.
István Bárány, 87, Hungarian swimmer and Olympic bronze medalist.
Bjarne Henning-Jensen, 86, Danish film director and screenwriter.
Juhan Viiding, 46, Estonian poet and actor, suicide.

22
Richard Arbib, 77, American industrial designer.
Ed Flanders, 60, American actor (St. Elsewhere, A Moon for the Misbegotten, The Exorcist III), Emmy winner (1976, 1977, 1983), suicide by gunshot.
Karl-Arne Holmsten, 83, Swedish film actor.
Jim Katcavage, 60, American gridiron football player.
Nicholas Pennell, 56, English actor.
Emmanuel Roblès, 80, Algerian-French novelist and playwright.

23
Norm Burns, 77, Canadian ice hockey player (New York Rangers).
Valerio Cassani, 72, Italian footballer.
Arrigo Cervetto, 67, Italian communist revolutionary and politician.
Sidney Robertson Cowell, 91, American ethnomusicologist.
Melvin Franklin, 52, American singer.
Mehr Abdul Haq, 79, Pakistani philologist.
Don Heck, 66, American comic book artist (Iron Man, The Avengers, Black Widow), lung cancer.
James Herriot, 78, English veterinarian and author (All Creatures Great and Small), prostate cancer.
Norman Hunter, 95, British children's author.
John Paul, 73, British actor (Doomwatch, Dr. Finlay's Casebook, The Curse of the Mummy's Tomb).
Margaret Woodbridge, 93, American swimmer and Olympic champion.
Peter Wykeham, 79, Royal Air Force Air marshal and flying ace during World War II.

24
Roberto Ago, 87, Italian jurist.
Felix Ermacora, 71, Austrian politician and human rights activist.
Hans Hessling, 91, German film and television actor.
Tatsumi Kumashiro, 67, Japanese film director, pulmonary embolism.
Hideko Maehata, 80, Japanese swimmer.
N. G. Krishna Murti, 85, Indian civil engineer.
Jack Wallace, 69, American football player and coach, traffic accident.

25
Francesco Antonazzi, 70, Italian football player.
Gediminas Baravykas, 54, Lithuanian architect.
Anne Davies, 64, American figure skater.
Rudolf Hausner, 80, Austrian painter, draughtsman, printmaker and sculptor.
O Jin-u, 77, North Korean general and politician, lung cancer.
Victor Montagu, 88, British Conservative Member of Parliament (MP).
John O'Brien, 67, New Zealand representative rower.
José Antonio Rojo, 72, Spanish film editor, heart attack.
Mariam Vattalil, 41, Indian activist and nun, murdered.
Terence Weil, 73, British cellist.

26
Zenon Ivanovich Borevich, 72, Russian mathematician.
Jack Clayton, 73, British film director (The Great Gatsby, Something Wicked This Way Comes, The Innocents'').
Barry Dyson, 52, English football player, heart attack.
Willie Johnson, 71, American electric blues guitarist.
Þórunn Elfa Magnúsdóttir, 84, Icelandic writer.

27
John Alford, 75, Archdeacon of Halifax.
Ann Ayars, 76, American soprano and actress.
Bill Bailey, 85, Irish-American Communist Party labor activist who fought in the Spanish Civil War, lung disease.
Gerhard Boetzelen, 89, German rower who competed in the 1932 Summer Olympics.
Bernard Cornfeld, 67, Turkish businessman and international financier.
Tom Evans, 65, Australian politician.
Giga Norakidze, 64, Georgian football player and manager.
Antonio Tróccoli, 70, Argentine politician.

28
Walter Allen, 84, English literary critic and novelist.
Ragnvald Mikal Andersen, 95, Norwegian politician.
Wally Millies, 88, American baseball player, scout and manager.
Bill Richards, 71, Canadian violinist, composer, arranger, and editor.
Keith Rigg, 88, Australian cricketer.
Max Rudolf, 92, German conductor and music educator.
Leonard Shure, 84, American concert pianist.

References 

1995-02
 02